The Stadio Artemio Franchi is a football stadium in Florence, Italy. It is currently the home of ACF Fiorentina. The old nickname of the stadium was "Comunale." When it was first constructed, it was known as the Stadio Giovanni Berta, after Florentine fascist Giovanni Berta.

The stadium was officially opened on 13 September 1931 with a match between Fiorentina and Admira Wien (1–0), though it took until 1932 for the stadium to be completely finished and currently holds 47,282. The architect is Pier Luigi Nervi (known for the Nervi Hall in the Vatican) and it is one of the most relevant examples of 20th-century architecture in the city. It hosted some of the matches of the 1934 World Cup, as well as football preliminaries for the 1960 Summer Olympics in Rome. In 1945, it hosted the Spaghetti Bowl between American service teams.

The stadium is built entirely of reinforced concrete with a 70 metre (230 ft) tower that bears the stadium's flagstaff. The tower is called the "Tower of Marathon". Around the base of the tower, spiral ramps lead from the ground floor to the upper edge of the grandstand. It was originally called the "Comunale" but was renamed after the former FIGC president, Artemio Franchi (1922–1983), in 1991. The stadium underwent renovations for the 1990 FIFA World Cup which included removing the running track and increasing the seating capacity. At the World Cup, the ground hosted three matches in Group A and Argentina's penalty shootout win over Yugoslavia in the quarter-finals.

The official record attendance is 58,271 on 25 November 1984, at a Serie A match between Fiorentina and Internazionale.

Concerts
David Bowie performed at the stadium during his Glass Spider Tour on 9 June 1987. Madonna performed, with Level 42 as her opening act, the final show of her Who's That Girl World Tour at the stadium on 6 September 1987. This performance was filmed and later released on VHS and DVD, titled Ciao, Italia! – Live from Italy. She performed at the stadium again 25 years later on 16 June 2012 to a sold-out crowd of 42,434 people during her MDNA Tour. Bruce Springsteen performed on 8 June 2003 at the stadium during his The Rising Tour and on 10 June 2012 for the Wrecking Ball World Tour, in front of 42,658 people. It rained throughout the 2012 concert.

National football team
The Italy national football team has played at the stadium, the first occasion being on 7 May 1933 in a 2–0 win over Czechoslovakia. The national team played only one game there between 1982 and 2006; a 2–0 friendly win against Mexico on 20 January 1993. On 1 March 2006, they played a friendly against Germany and won 4–1. The stadium hosted two matches in Euro 2012 qualifying: a 5–0 win over the Faroe Islands, and a 1–0 win over Slovenia on 6 September 2011 which was its most recent international hosting. During the match with Faroe Islands on 7 September 2010, Fabio Quagliarella (a member of Juventus at the time) scored a goal. Because Fiorentina fans have such a strong rivalry with Juventus, the fans at the stadium booed Quagliarella.

National rugby team

The stadium has also hosted international rugby union matches. Italy played Australia on 20 November 2010, losing by a score of 14–32. Italy beat South Africa at the stadium on 19 November 2016, defeating the Springboks for the first time in their history. The final score was 20–18.

1954 UFO sightings
On 27 October 1954, a reserve game between Fiorentina and nearby rivals Pistoiese was under way at the Stadio Artemio Franchi when a group of UFOs traveling at high speed abruptly stopped over the stadium. The stadium became silent as the crowd of around 10,000 spectators witnessed the event and described the UFOs as cigar shaped. It was suggested that the most likely explanation was that the silk of mass migrating spiders had agglomerated high in the atmosphere.

1934 FIFA World Cup
The stadium was one of the venues of the 1934 FIFA World Cup, and held the following matches:

1990 FIFA World Cup
The stadium was one of the venues of the 1990 FIFA World Cup, and held the following matches:

References

Artemio Franchi
1934 FIFA World Cup stadiums
1990 FIFA World Cup stadiums
Venues of the 1960 Summer Olympics
Olympic football venues
Stadium
Rugby union stadiums in Italy
UEFA Euro 1968 stadiums
Sports venues in Florence
Sports venues completed in 1931
American football venues in Italy
1931 establishments in Italy
Artemio
Pier Luigi Nervi buildings